The CMIC Music Awards, commonly abbreviated as CMA, is an annual music award show presented by China Audio-Video and Digital Publishing Association. 

The 1st CMIC Music Awards ceremony was held on July 20, 2017.

Ceremonies

Categories 

 Album of the Year
 Song of the Year
 Male Singer of the Year
 Female Singer of the Year
 Band of the Year
 Duo/Group of the Year
 New Artist of the Year
 Best Pop Album
 Best Pop Solo Performance
 Best Rock Album
 Best Rock Performance
 Best Contemporary Folk Album
 Best Contemporary Folk Performance
 Best Electronic Music Album
 Best Electronic Music Performance
 Best Chinese Traditional Vocal Album
 Best Chinese Traditional Instrumental Album
 Best Rap Album
 Best Rap Performance

 Best Jazz Vocal Album
 Best Jazz Instrumental Album
 Best Contemporary Classical Composition Album
 Best Classical Performance Album
 Best Score Soundtrack for Visual Media
 Best Score Soundtrack for Video Game
 Best Children's Album
 Best Lyrics
 Best Composition
 Best Arrangement
 Best Production for Record, Non-Classical
 Best Production for Album, Non-Classical
 Best Engineered Recording
 Best Mixed Recording
 Best Visual Design
 Best Music Video
 Chairman's Award
 Outstanding Contribution Award

References

External links 

Awards established in 2017
Chinese music awards